The Will Rogers Follies is a musical with a book by Peter Stone, lyrics by Betty Comden and Adolph Green, and music by Cy Coleman.

It focuses on the life and career of famed humorist and performer Will Rogers, using as a backdrop the Ziegfeld Follies, which he often headlined, and describes every episode in his life in the form of a big production number.  The Rogers character also performs rope tricks in between scenes.  The revue contains snippets of Rogers' famous homespun style of wisdom and common sense and tries to convey the personality of this quintessentially American figure whose most famous quote was "I never met a man I didn't like."

Productions
After thirty-three previews, the Broadway production opened on May 1, 1991, at the Palace Theatre, and closed on September 5, 1993 after 981 performances. Directed and choreographed by Tommy Tune, the original cast included Keith Carradine as Rogers, Dee Hoty as Betty Blake, Dick Latessa as Will's father Clem, and Cady Huffman as Ziegfeld's favorite chorus girl. Replacements later in the run included Mac Davis and Larry Gatlin as Rogers, Mickey Rooney as Clem, and Susan Anton and Marla Maples as Ziegfeld's favorite chorus girl. The recorded voice of Gregory Peck was heard as Ziegfeld.

The original choice of the authors to play Will Rogers was John Denver, but, due to a perceived insult from librettist Peter Stone, Denver bowed out of consideration for casting.

The show also enjoyed a number of national tours, with Carradine, Davis, and Gatlin in the first National tour in 1993 and 1994.  Pat Boone starred in the musical in Branson, Missouri in 1994.  The role of Betty (his wife) was played by Marylee Graffeo(Fairbanks). Variety noted that "Broadway Came To Branson with the bow of the 'Will Rogers Follies: A Life in Review' in the new Will Rogers Theater last Saturday...Pat Boone is a solid hit in Branson as Will Rogers in the 'Follies.'" The music was not live but digitalized.

Synopsis
Act I

Rogers frequently speaks directly to the audience and to Florenz Ziegfeld himself, who often interjects to question the progress of the show and to give some directorial advice.  After introducing the audience to his friends and family, Rogers discusses leaving home at 19 to become a cowboy in Argentina.  Ziegfeld tells Rogers that he must "meet the girl".  Although Rogers met Betty Blake at a train station, Ziegfeld creates a more "theatrical" meeting by having her lowered romantically from the moon.

Because Betty is eager to marry Rogers, the show moves forward several years to a time when Rogers is playing in a small Wild West revue.  The couple is about to be married, but Ziegfeld interrupts, saying that the wedding has to be delayed, because it must occur in the first act finale.  So, as Rogers' success continues to grow, he and Betty travel around the country performing and produce four children.  Rogers gets his big break when he is invited to join the Ziegfeld Follies and, by the early 1910s, he is a big vaudeville and radio star.  He is about to leave for Hollywood to start a career in film, when it is at last time for the finale and the wedding.

Act II

Rogers is at the zenith of his popularity, the country's biggest and highest paid star of every medium of his time– stage, screen, radio, newspapers, and public appearances– and is even asked to run for president.  This doesn't leave him much time for Betty, and she begins to feel neglected and starts singing the blues.  Rogers comes home with "a treasury of precious jewels," and all is forgiven.  The good mood doesn't last long, however, as bill collectors and creditors come knocking at the door.  Ziegfeld has lost his fortune, and the Great Depression is in full swing.  Herbert Hoover asks Rogers to give a speech to the nation, and everyone is inspired.  Rogers also reconciles with his estranged father.  The show ends with the tragic plane ride in Alaska that he shares with Wiley Post, a character whose cheerful invitation, "Let's go flyin' Will!" is heard throughout the show.

Songs

Act I
 Prelude - "Let's Go Flying" - Chorus
 "Will-a-Mania" - Ziegfeld's Favorite and Chorus
 "Give a Man Enough Rope" - Will and Ziegfeld's cowboys
 "It's a Boy!" - Clem and Girls Sextet (Will's sisters)
 "It's a Boy! (Reprise)" - Clem
 "My Unknown Someone" - Betty Blake
 "The St. Louis Fair" - Girls Sextet (Betty's sisters)
 "The Big Time" - Will, Betty, Will Jr., Mary, James, and Freddy
 "My Big Mistake" - Betty Blake
 "The Powder Puff Ballet" - Ziegfeld Girls
 "Marry Me Now" - Will, Betty, and Ensemble
 "I Got You" - Will, Betty and Ensemble

Act II
 "Give a Man Enough Rope (Reprise)" - Will and Ziegfeld's cowboys
 "Look Around" - Will Rogers
 "Our Favorite Son" - Will, Ziegfeld's Favorite, Ziegfeld Girls, and Ziegfeld's cowboys
 "No Man Left For Me" - Betty Blake
 "Presents for Mrs. Rogers" - Will and Ziegfeld's cowboys
 "Never Met a Man I Didn't Like" - Will Rogers
 "Will-a-Mania (Reprise)" - Clem, Will, and Chorus
 "Without You" - Betty Blake
 "Never Met a Man I Didn't Like (Reprise)" - Will and Chorus

Characters and original cast
Will Rogers - Keith Carradine
Betty Blake - Dee Hoty
Clem Rogers (Will's father) - Dick Latessa
Ziegfeld's Favorite - Cady Huffman
Mr. Ziegfeld (voice) - Gregory Peck
Wiley Post - Paul Ukena Jr.
Will Rogers Jr. - Rick Faugno
Mary Rogers - Tammy Minoff
James Rogers - Lance Robinson
Freddy Rogers - Gregory Scott Carter
Betty's sisters; Will's sisters; some of the New Ziegfeld Girls; The Will Rogers Wranglers, etc.

Awards and nominations

Original Broadway production

References

External links
 
Information about the show and national tours
Synopsis and music at Guide to Musical Theatre
Cast Album

1991 musicals
Broadway musicals
Grammy Award for Best Musical Theater Album
Musicals inspired by real-life events
Tony Award for Best Musical
Musicals by Cy Coleman
Musicals by Betty Comden and Adolph Green
Musicals by Peter Stone
Plays set in the United States
Plays based on real people
Plays set in the 1910s
Plays set in the 1920s
Plays set in the 1930s
Cultural depictions of Will Rogers
Cultural depictions of Herbert Hoover
Tony Award-winning musicals